Louis Jacobs (16 December 1884 – 21 December 1936) was an Australian rules footballer who played with Fitzroy in the Victorian Football League (VFL).

Notes

External links 
		

1884 births
1936 deaths
Australian rules footballers from Victoria (Australia)
Fitzroy Football Club players